Albert Ramassamy (13 November 1923 – 2 November 2018) was a French politician.

Biography
Previously having been a professor, Ramassamy ran for Senator in 1983 and won, representing the region of Réunion.

He was not reelected in 1992 after serving on the Committee on Constitutional Laws, Legislation, Universal Suffrage, Regulation and General Administration.

In addition to politics, Ramassamy wrote three books: 
La Réunion : décolonisation et intégration (1987)(OCLC number 492952088)
La Réunion face à l'avenir (1973)(OCLC number 492951767)
La Réunion : les problèmes posés par l'intégration (1973)(OCLC number 492933221)

References

1923 births
2018 deaths
Politicians of Réunion
Senators of Réunion
20th-century French politicians